Aurelia Gabriela Tizón de Perón (March 18, 1902 – September 10, 1938) was an Argentine educator and the first wife of former Argentine president Juan Perón.

Biography 
Aurelia Gabriela Tizón was born in Buenos Aires either in 1902 or, as some sources place it, in 1908. She was the daughter of Tomasa Erostarbe and Cipriano Tizón, a photographer and owner of a photography shop. 

She met Juan Domingo Perón during the years of his military career, in 1925; she was working as a teacher at the time. They became a couple, and Perón affectionately called her "Potota," a childish play on the word "preciosa," meaning "precious."

Perón and Tizón married in a private ceremony on January 5, 1929, and they honeymooned in Bariloche. She continued her work as teacher, including at Escuela No. 2 "República de Honduras."

Tizón was a woman of many talents. She drew, painted and played piano and guitar. She could also read English and translated texts between English and Spanish.

The couple had no children, though it is reported that they were planning on adopting a child.

After 13 years together, Tizón died of uterine cancer in 1938. She was only 36 years old. She was buried in a niche at the Chacarita cemetery in Buenos Aires, but, after Perón wed his second wife Eva Duarte, her family had her remains transferred to the El Salvador Cemetery in Rosario, Argentina.

Later in his life, during his many years as president of Argentina, Perón rarely mentioned his first marriage, as his second and third wives, Eva and Isabel, loomed larger. Tizón is generally lesser-known among Argentines, in part because during the years of their marriage Juan Perón was not yet a national figure.

References 

1902 births
1938 deaths
Argentine educators
Argentine women educators
People from Buenos Aires
Spanish–English translators
Deaths from cancer in Argentina
Deaths from uterine cancer
Juan Perón